The 2020 Southern Conference men's basketball tournament was the postseason men's basketball tournament for the Southern Conference for the 2019–20 season. All tournament games were played at the Harrah's Cherokee Center in Asheville, North Carolina, from March 6 through 9, 2020. The winner of the tournament received the conference's automatic bid to the 2020 NCAA Division I men's basketball tournament, which was subsequently cancelled due to the COVID pandemic.

Seeds
All ten teams in the Southern Conference are eligible to compete in the conference tournament. Teams will be seeded by record within the conference, with a tiebreaker system to seed teams with identical conference records. The top six teams received first-round byes.

Schedule and results

Bracket

See also
2020 Southern Conference women's basketball tournament

References

Tournament
Southern Conference men's basketball tournament
College sports tournaments in North Carolina
Basketball competitions in Asheville, North Carolina
College basketball in North Carolina
Southern Conference men's basketball tournament
Southern Conference men's basketball tournament